Sphaerodactylus gilvitorques,  also known as the Jamaican collared sphaero or Jamaican least gecko, is a species of lizard in the family Sphaerodactylidae. It is endemic to Jamaica.

References

Sphaerodactylus
Reptiles of Jamaica
Endemic fauna of Jamaica
Reptiles described in 1862